This is a list of notable ship breaking yards:

See also 
 List of dry docks
List of the largest shipbuilding companies
List of shipbuilders and shipyards
Israel Shipyards
Ship breaking

References 

Ship breaking